Control: The Remixes (issued as More Control in Japan) is the first remix album (and fourth album overall) by American recording artist Janet Jackson. Released on January 26, 1987, in the United Kingdom, continental Europe, and Japan only, it contains remixes of singles from Control, following the success of the album. Several of the remixes, notably "When I Think of You" and "Control", were the versions featured in their respective music videos. Most of the remixes were also available as B-sides to the original versions. In 2019, the album has been reissued on CD, Vinyl and all digital platforms.

Track listing

European release

UK release

Japan release (More Control)

2019 reissue

Notes
 "Let's Wait Awhile (Remix)" & "The Pleasure Principle (Dub Edit - The Shep Pettibone Mix)" contain earlier fade outs on the 2019 release.

Personnel
 Melanie Andrews – vocal arrangement
 Tuta Aquino – editing
 Mark Collen – compilation
 Steve Hodge – mixing, mixing engineer
 Janet Jackson – producer, vocal arrangement, rhythm arrangements
 Jimmy Jam – composer, producer, vocal arrangement, rhythm arrangements
 Terry Lewis – composer, producer, vocal arrangement, rhythm arrangements
 John McClain – executive producer
 Monte Moir – producer
 Shep Pettibone – editing, producer
 Bob Rosa – remixing
 Steve Wiese – producer

Charts

Certifications

References

Albums produced by Jimmy Jam and Terry Lewis
Janet Jackson remix albums
1987 remix albums
A&M Records remix albums